The fauna of Toronto include a variety of different species situated within the city limits. Toronto contains a mosaic of ecosystems that includes forests, rivers, streams, and wetlands, which allows it to support a large variety of fauna. Approximately 90 per cent of animals that inhabit the city reside within the Toronto ravine system. The city's ravine system, creeks and rivers are wildlife corridors that allow animals to travel from one area of the city to another. Although most animals in Toronto reside within the ravine system, several animals also live in the city's urban environment and parks. 

The City of Toronto reports there are 24 species of amphibians and reptiles, 38 species of mammals, over 410 bird species, and a large number of insect genera in the city. There are also over 100 species of fish reported within the Greater Toronto Area.  

Toronto was also in the historic range of several other animals, although the city's urban growth in the 19th century and early 20th century led to these species' natural range to recede beyond the city limits.

Vertebrates

Amphibians and reptiles

There are 24 species of amphibians and reptiles that are considered native species within the city limits of Toronto, with most populations concentrated in the wetlands found in the city. Six of these native species were listed under the federal Species at Risk Act. The following amphibian and reptile species (sorted by family) may be found throughout the City of Toronto:

Chelydridae
Common snapping turtle
Colubridae
Common garter snake
De Kay's snake
Milksnake
Northern redbelly snake
Northern water snake
Smooth green snake
Hylidae
Grey tree frog
Spring peeper
Western chorus frog
Kinosternidae
Eastern musk turtle
Lungless salamander
Eastern red-backed salamander
Mole salamander
Spotted salamander
Pond turtle
Blanding's turtle
Midland painted turtle
Northern map turtle
Pond slider
Spotted turtle
Wood turtle
Proteidae
Common mudpuppy
True frog
American bullfrog
Green frog
Northern leopard frog
Wood frog
True salamander
Eastern newt
True toad
American toad

Birds

At least 195 bird species were confirmed to breed in the area, with a total of 410 species of birds recorded in the Greater Toronto Area (either breeding, in migration, or vagrant). A number of birds pass through the Toronto while migrating, with the city being situated around where the Atlantic and the Mississippi migratory flyways converge.

The following bird species (sorted by family) have been spotted in the City of Toronto, and Greater Toronto:

Accipitridae
 Bald eagle
 Five species from the genus Buteo
 Cooper's hawk
 Golden eagle
 Mississippi kite
 Northern goshawk
 Northern harrier
 Sharp-shinned hawk
 Swallow-tailed kite
Anatidae
 Nine species from the subfamily Anatinae
 Barrow's goldeneye
 Bufflehead
 Canada goose
 Canvasback
 Common eider
 Common goldeneye
 Common merganser
 Lesser scaup
 Long-tailed duck
 Hooded merganser
 Harlequin duck
 Mute swan
 Red-breasted merganser
 Redhead
 Ruddy duck
 Trumpeter swan
 Wood duck
Auks
 Ancient murrelet
 Black guillemot
 Little auk
 Razorbill
 Thick-billed murre
Barn-owl
 Barn owl
Calcariidae
 Lapland longspur
 Chestnut-collared longspur
 Snow bunting
Cardinal
 Blue grosbeak
 Dickcissel
 Indigo bunting
 Lazuli bunting
 Northern cardinal
 Painted bunting
 Rose-breasted grosbeak
 Summer tanager
 Western tanager
Charadriidae
 American golden-plover
 Black-bellied Plover
 Killdeer
 Semipalmated Plover
 Piping Plover
Coots
 American coot
 American purple gallinule
 Common gallinule
 King rail
 Sora
 Virginia rail
 Yellow rail
Cormorant
 Double-crested cormorant
 Great cormorant
Crane
 Sandhill crane
 Whooping crane
Crow
 American crow
 Blue jay
 Black-billed magpie
 Common raven
 Canada jay
 Western jackdaw
Cuckoo
 Black-billed cuckoo
 Yellow-billed cuckoo
Falcon
 American kestrel
 Merlin
 Gyrfalcon
 Peregrine falcon
Finch
 Arctic redpoll
 American goldfinch
 Brambling
 Common redpoll
 Evening grosbeak
 House finch
 Lesser goldfinch
 Pine grosbeak
 Pine siskin
 Purple finch
 Red crossbill
 Two-barred crossbill
Gannet
 Northern gannet
Gnatcatcher
 Blue-grey gnatcatcher
Grebe
 Black-necked grebe
 Horned grebe
 Pied-billed grebe
 Red-necked grebe
 Western grebe
Heron
 American bittern
 Black-crowned night heron
 Cattle egret
 Green heron
 Great blue heron
 Great egret
 Little blue heron
 Snowy egret
 Tricolored heron
 Yellow-crowned night heron
Hummingbird
 Rufous hummingbird
 Ruby-throated hummingbird
Ibis
 American white ibis
 Glossy ibis
 White-faced ibis
Icterid
 Baltimore oriole
 Bobolink
 Brewer's blackbird
 Brown-headed cowbird
 Bullock's oriole
 Common grackle 
 Eastern meadowlark
 Orchard oriole
 Red-winged blackbird
 Rusty blackbird
 Western meadowlark
 Yellow-headed blackbird
Kingfisher
Belted kingfisher
Kinglet
 Golden-crowned kinglet
 Ruby-crowned kinglet
Laridae
 Arctic tern
 Black-headed gull
 Black-legged kittiwake
 Black skimmer
 Black tern
 Bonaparte's gull
 Caspian tern
 Forster's tern
 Franklin's gull
 Ivory gull
 Eleven species from the genus Larus
 Laughing gull
 Little gull
 Sabine's gull
Lark
Horned lark
Loon
 Common loon
 Pacific loon
 Red-throated loon
Mimid
 Brown thrasher
 Grey catbird
 Northern mockingbird
Motacillidae
Buff-bellied pipit
 New World quail
 Northern bobwhite
New World vulture
 Black vulture
 Turkey vulture
New World warbler
 52 species of New World warblers
Nightjar
 Chuck-will’s-widow
 Common nighthawk
 Eastern whip-poor-will
Nuthatch
 Red-breasted nuthatch
 White-breasted nuthatch
Old World flycatcher
 Northern wheatear
 Siberian rubythroat
Osprey
 Osprey
Oystercatcher
 American oystercatcher
Pelican
 American white pelican
 Brown pelican
Phasianidae
 Common pheasant
 Grey partridge
 Ruffed grouse
 Spruce grouse
 Willow ptarmigan
 Wild turkey
Pigeons
 Band-tailed pigeon
 Eurasian collared dove
 Mourning dove
 Rock dove
 White-winged dove
Procellariidae
 Black-capped petrel
 Great shearwater
 Manx shearwater
 Northern fulmar
Recurvirostridae
 American avocet
 Black-necked stilt
Sandpiper
 34 species of sandpipers
Shrike
 Loggerhead shrike
 Northern shrike
Skua
 Long-tailed jaeger
 Pomarine jaeger
 Parasitic jaeger
Sparrows
 24 species of sparrows
Starling
 Common starling
Swallows
 Barn swallow
 Cave swallow
 Northern rough-winged swallow
 Purple martin
 Sand martin 
 Tree swallow
Swift
Chimney swift
Thrush
 American robin
 Eastern bluebird
 Fieldfare
 Grey-cheeked thrush
 Hermit thrush
 Northern wheatear
 Siberian rubythroat
 Swainson's thrush
 Townsend's solitaire
 Varied thrush
 Veery
 Wood thrush
Treecreeper
 Brown creeper
True owl
 Barred owl
 Boreal owl
 Burrowing owl
 Eastern screech owl
 Great horned owl
 Long-eared owl
 Northern hawk owl
 Short-eared owl
 Snowy owl
Tyrant flycatcher
 Ash-throated flycatcher
 Eastern kingbird
 Eastern phoebe
 Eastern wood pewee
 Six species from the genus Empidonax
 Fork-tailed flycatcher
 Great crested flycatcher
 Olive-sided flycatcher
 Scissor-tailed flycatcher
 Sulphur-bellied flycatcher
 Variegated flycatcher
 Vermilion flycatcher
 Western kingbird
Tit
 Black-capped chickadee
 Boreal chickadee
 Tufted titmouse
Vireonidae
 Seven species from the genus Vireo.
Waxwing
 Bohemian waxwing
 Cedar waxwing
 Phainopepla
Woodpecker
 American three-toed woodpecker
 Black-backed woodpecker
 Downy woodpecker
 Hairy woodpecker
 Northern flicker
 Pileated woodpecker
 Red-bellied woodpecker
 Red-headed woodpecker
 Yellow-bellied sapsucker
Wren
 Bewick's wren
 Carolina wren
 House wren
 Marsh wren
 Rock wren
 Sedge wren
 Winter wren

Fish

There is approximately 100 species of coldwater, coolwater, and warmwater fish found within the waterways of Greater Toronto. The following fish species are found in the creeks, ponds, and rivers that make up the Toronto waterway system, and the Toronto waterfront along Lake Ontario:

Black bullhead
Black crappie
Bluegill
Bluntnose minnow
Channel catfish
Chinook salmon
Green sunfish
Largemouth bass
Northern hog sucker
Northern pike
Pumpkinseed
Spottail shiner
Stonecat
Tadpole madtom
White bass
White sucker
Yellow perch

Mammals

There are 38 species of mammals that reside within Toronto, although these numbers have fluctuated due to environmental changes and loss of natural habitats during the past century. The following mammals (sorted by family) may be found throughout the City of Toronto:

Canids
Coyote
Red fox
Castoridae
North American beaver
Cricetidae
Deer mouse
Meadow vole
Muskrat
White-footed mouse
Deer
White-tailed deer
Dipodidae
Meadow jumping mouse
Hares and rabbits
Eastern cottontail
European hare
Snowshoe hare
Muridae
Brown rat 
House mouse
Mustelidae
American mink
Long-tailed weasel
North American river otter
Short-tailed weasel
New World porcupine
Canadian porcupine
Opossum
Virginia opossum
Procyonidae
Raccoon
Shrew
American pygmy shrew
Masked shrew
Northern short-tailed shrew
Smoky shrew
Skunk
Striped skunk
Squirrel
American red squirrel
Eastern chipmunk
Eastern grey squirrel (including black squirrels)
Groundhog
Northern flying squirrel
Southern flying squirrel
Talpidae
Hairy-tailed mole
Star-nosed mole
Vesper bat
Big brown bat
Eastern red bat
Eastern small-footed myotis
Hoary bat
Little brown bat
Silver-haired bat
Northern long-eared bat

Historic species
The historic range for several mammal species once extended into the City of Toronto. However, as the city developed, the natural range for several mammals receded beyond the city limits. At least 11 species of mammals were extirpated from the region. The historic range for the following mammals once included Toronto, but were pushed beyond the city limits prior to 1912:

Bear
American black bear
Canids
Grey wolf
Cats
Bobcat
Canada lynx
Cougar
Cricetidae
Southern red-backed vole
Deer
Elk
Moose
Mustelidae
American marten
Fisher

Invertebrates

Within the city of Toronto, there exists approximately 110 species of butterflies, although this number is prone to fluctuations as a result of a varied environment from year to year. There is approximately six families of bees in Toronto, which includes 37 genera and 364 species of bees in Toronto. Past published records estimate that there are 25 genera and approximately 200 species of spiders in Toronto; 24 of which were introduced to the region. However, it is estimated that the actual number of species that exist in the city is approximately three times larger. The following insects may be found throughout the City of Toronto including:

Alderfly
Ants
Apoidea
Bees
Hornet
Wasp
Barklice
Beetles
Caddisfly
Common walkingstick
Dusky cockroach
Common earwig
Fishflies
Dark fishfly
Spring fishfly
Flies
Lacewings
Brown lacewing
Green lacewing
Lepidoptera
Butterflies
Moth
Mayfly
Odonata
Damselflies
Dragonflies
Orthoptera
Ensifera
Grasshopper
Scorpionfly
Stonefly
Praying mantis

See also

Fauna of Canada
List of Toronto parks
Native trees in Toronto
Toronto and Region Conservation Authority

Notes

References

External links
 Wildlife in the City

Fauna of Canada
Fauna of the Great Lakes region (North America)
Environment of Toronto